Barnett McFee Clinedinst (September 12, 1862 – March 15, 1953) was the official White House photographer.  Clinedinst was born in Woodstock, Virginia, to Barnett M. Clinedinst and Mary C. South.

In his youth he operated a circus and worked as a salesman. He then learned photography from his father. By 1900 he opened a photographic studio in Washington, DC. He became the White House photographer for President McKinley, Theodore Roosevelt, and President Taft.

He died on March 15, 1953, in Saint Petersburg, Florida.

Photographs

References

External links

Barnett McFee Clinedinst Jr. images at Flickr Commons
 
 https://patents.google.com/patent/US129104A/en
 https://patents.google.com/patent/US523323A/en

1862 births
1953 deaths
American photographers
White House photographers